Maianthemum salvinii is a rare perennial, epiphytic herb found in southern Mexico and Guatemala.

Description
Leafy, straight to arching stems are hairless and ribbed.

Leaves
Leaf blades are hairless, lance- to egg-shaped with pointed tips and rounded to long-tapered bases and with flat (not undulating) edges.

Inflorescence
120 to 150 flowers are set in a complex raceme with a main axis 14–35 cm long that is hanging but straight. The axis is ribbed, and smooth. There are 25 to 40 nodes along the main axis, set about 5 cm apart and set in helix along the main axis. Each node has 3 or 4 flowers set on slightly bent-back, drooping pedicels that are usually 15–25 (up to 30) mm long.

Flowers and fruits
The flowers are cup-shaped, with spreading tepals that are 4–4.5 mm long and lavender to pale pink. Stamens are inserted at the tepal bases. Fruits are rounded, 8–10 mm across, ripening to red. Flowering is in March; fruits are retained into January or February.

Distribution
The distribution of Maianthemum salvinii is not well documented, but is reported from Guatemala and southeast Mexico. It is thought to be rare. The site in Guatemala that it was found has been developed, so is unlikely to have persisted there. It has also been documented adjacent to Guatemala, in the mountainous Tacaná-Boquerón region of Chiapas, Mexico.

Habitat and ecology
Maianthemum salvinii Is an epiphyte of primary forests. In Guatemala it was found in forests on white sand slopes at 1800-2000m. It has also been found in the mountainous Tacaná-Boquerón region that has extensive montane cloud forests.

References

External links
Picture of the type specimen at GBIF

Bibliography

salvinii
Flora of Chiapas
Flora of Guatemala